Hepscott is a small village in the county of Northumberland, England, about  south east of Morpeth, the county town.

The name is Anglo-Saxon in origin and a derivation of "Shepherd's Cote". This suggests that the village, which was a hamlet prior to expansion since the 1980s, originated as the homestead of a shepherd, possibly in the early medieval period.

Governance
Hepscott lies within the Ulgham Division of the new county-wide unitary authority, Northumberland County Council. The County Councillor is Cllr David J. Towns (Conservative), and the village falls within the Northern Area Committee's jurisdiction.

Landmarks
The most historic building in Hepscott is Hepscott Hall, a three-storey, rectangular medieval pele tower. The Hall was associated with a deer park. The traces of part of the boundary wall of the deer park survive along the track to Field House Farm. Another historic building of importance is a smithy dating to the late 18th century that is a Grade II Listed Building.
The heart of the community is the village hall, there are regular events and cultural activities including art shows, flower arranging lessons, wine tasting evenings and poetry recitals.

Notable people
Hepscott has recently lost its longest-living resident. Mrs Irene Violet Bevan was born at Barmoor, in the parish of Hepscott, on 27 January 1920. She died on 16 August 2010 aged 90. She knew Hepscott from a time when farming was by hand and horse, when Barmoor was bombed by the Luftwaffe and before it doubled in size from the 1970s onwards. She was instrumental in the Hepscott WI, Over 60s Club and Tea Party. She also helped save the land that the school and church stood on from development from personal knowledge that the land was left to the village by Lord Carlisle. It is partly due to her that there is a village hall on this land.

Irene was a cousin, once-removed of the suffragette Emily Wilding Davison. Her mother and Emily were close friends as well as cousins. Irene held the family knowledge inherited from her mother that Emily did not intend to kill herself when she accosted the King's horse at the Epsom Derby in 1913. Her intention was to pin the suffragette colours on the horse.

Other notable residents have included footballers John Barnes, David McCreary, Anton Ferdinand, Steven Taylor and football managers Jack Charlton, Gordon Lee and Ellie Taggart also with her brother Alfie Taggart a player for the Scottish rugby team.

References

http://hepscottparishcouncil.org.uk/

External links

Northumberland Communities (accessed: 27 November 2008)

Villages in Northumberland